Pavel Antonovich Shurmei (born 1 September 1976) is a Belarusian rower who competed at two Olympic Games and holds multiple world records on the Concept2 indoor rowing machine. He is one of the Belarusian volunteers of the Kastuś Kalinoŭski Battalion.

Rowing career 

Shurmei's primary discipline is sculling.

Olympic Games 

Shurmei competed at both the 2004 and 2008 Olympic Games with the Belarusian team.

At the 2004 Games, Shurmei competed in the men's quadruple sculls. His team came third in their heat, qualifying for the semi-final, in which they finished third. This qualified them for the A final of the event, where they finished last of the six teams.

At the 2008 Games, Shurmei competed again in the men's quadruple sculls. His team finished third in their heat, qualifying for the semi-final, in which they finished last. This meant that they progressed to the B final, where they finished 5th for a position of 11th overall.

Indoor rowing career 

Shurmei has won the CRASH-B Sprints in the open category twice, in 2004 and 2005. He has also come 2nd twice, in 2013 and 2017.

Shurmei has won the international ALFA indoor rowing competition seven times and hold the competition record since 2003 (2:39.8 over 1000m).

He currently holds the world records in the 40–49 heavyweight category for both the 1000m and 2000m distances.

World rankings 

Below are the season-end world rankings for Shurmei in various indoor rowing events where he finished in the top 50.

500m

1000m

2000m

Personal bests

Military career

He is serving on the Ukrainian side in the 2022 Russian invasion of Ukraine.

References

External links 

 
 
 Pavel Shurmei at Eurosport
 
 https://by.tribuna.com/amp/news/1107596894-eks-grebecz-pavel-shurmej/

1976 births
Living people
Belarusian male rowers
Olympic rowers of Belarus
Rowers at the 2004 Summer Olympics
Rowers at the 2008 Summer Olympics
World Games bronze medalists
Ukrainian military personnel of the 2022 Russian invasion of Ukraine
People from Lida
Sportspeople from Grodno Region
Foreign volunteers in the 2022 Russian invasion of Ukraine